Dust Beyglu (also Romanized as Dūst Beyglū; also known as Dust‘ali Beyglū) is a village in Dasht Rural District, in the Central District of Meshgin Shahr County, Ardabil Province, Iran. At the 2006 census, its population was 769, in 149 families.

References 

Tageo

Towns and villages in Meshgin Shahr County